Iron Chef Gauntlet is a television series on Food Network that began airing on April 16, 2017.  The series is a reboot of the Iron Chef and Iron Chef America series that gained popularity on Food Network and is hosted by Alton Brown, who also takes over as the series' Chairman. Seven chefs from around the country battle each other in an elimination contest, with the last chef remaining then facing a "gauntlet" challenge of defeating three other Iron Chefs in order to earn the title of Iron Chef. In the first season, the Iron Chefs forming the Gauntlet were Bobby Flay, Masaharu Morimoto, and Michael Symon. The second season of Iron Chef Gauntlet began airing April 4, 2018 and was scheduled for six episodes. The Gauntlet Iron Chefs for the second season were Alex Guarnaschelli, Gauntlet season one winner Stephanie Izard, and Michael Symon.

Overview
Each regular episode consists of two challenges. The first is the Chairman's Challenge, with Brown announcing a theme in which all chefs must cook a dish for him to judge. The loser of this round is entered into the second round; the winner is safe from elimination for the week and may nominate one other chef to compete in the second round.

The second round is the Secret Ingredient Showdown, in which the two chefs have one hour to prepare three dishes featuring a mystery ingredient. The dishes are evaluated by a panel of two judges, who can each award up to 20 points (10 for taste, five each for plating and originality). The chef with the lower total is eliminated, while the winner advances to the next episode.

During the next-to-last episode of the season, which features three chefs, the loser of the Chairman's Challenge is automatically eliminated and the remaining two chefs compete in the Secret Ingredient Showdown.

In the season finale, the last remaining chef competes in three Secret Ingredient Showdowns, one against each of the three Iron Chefs. If the chef's overall score is higher than the combined total of the three, he/she is awarded the title of Iron Chef. If the chef's overall score falls short, no new Iron Chef is named for the season.

Season 1: 2017

Contestants
 Nyesha Arrington (Los Angeles, California);  Former Executive Chef/Owner, Leona
 Jason Dady (San Antonio, Texas); Executive Chef/Owner, Tre Trattoria
 Sarah Grueneberg (Chicago, Illinois);  Executive Chef/Owner, Monteverde
 Michael Gulotta (New Orleans, Louisiana);  Executive Chef/Owner, MOPHO
 Stephanie Izard (Chicago, Illinois); Executive Chef/Owner, Girl & the Goat; Izard lost to Iron Chef Michael Symon in Battle Bread on Iron Chef America.
 Shota Nakajima (Seattle, Washington); Executive Chef/Owner, Adana
 Jonathon Sawyer (Cleveland, Ohio); Executive Chef/Owner, The Greenhouse Tavern; Sawyer was Iron Chef Michael Symon's sous chef in his early battles, and later lost to Iron Chef Geoffrey Zakarian in Battle Mint.

Judges
 Episode 1: Geoffrey Zakarian and Donatella Arpaia Stewart
 Episode 2: Jose Garces and Anne Burrell
 Episode 3: Marc Forgione and Giada De Laurentiis
 Episode 4: Cat Cora and Ali Bouzari
 Episode 5: Alex Guarnaschelli and Ching He Huang
 Episode 6: Anya Fernald and Ludo Lefebvre

Contestant progress

 (IRON CHEF) The final chef survived the Gauntlet and became an Iron Chef.
 (WINNER) This chef won the competition.
 (IN) The chef was not selected as a top or bottom entry in the Chairman's Challenge or did not compete in the Secret Ingredient Showdown.
 (LOW) The chef lost the Chairman's Challenge and must compete in the Secret Ingredient Showdown.
 (SEL) The chef was selected to compete in the Secret Ingredient Showdown.
 (WIN) The chef won the Chairman's Challenge or Secret Ingredient Showdown.
 (OUT) The chef lost the Secret Ingredient Showdown and was eliminated.

Results

Episode 1: Into the Wild
 Chairman's Challenge: The chefs are given 30 minutes to prepare a dish using various wild game meats and earthy vegetables and mushrooms.
WINNER: Stephanie Izard
LOSER: Sarah Grueneberg
CHOSEN TO CHALLENGE: Nyesha Arrington
 Secret Ingredient Showdown: Lobster is the secret ingredient.
WINNER: Sarah Grueneberg
ELIMINATED: Nyesha Arrington
 First aired: April 16, 2017

Episode 2: Nose to Tail
 Chairman's Challenge: The chefs draw cards to select a cut of a suckling pig and must prepare a dish with their cut.
WINNER: Sarah Grueneberg
LOSER: Shota Nakajima
CHOSEN TO CHALLENGE: Jonathon Sawyer
 Secret Ingredient Showdown: Bananas and plantains are the secret ingredients.
WINNER: Shota Nakajima
ELIMINATED: Jonathon Sawyer
 First aired: April 23, 2017

Episode 3: Sweet and Savory
 Chairman's Challenge: The chefs are presented with a selection of sweet and savory items, but can only pick one item and must make both a sweet and a savory dish with it.
WINNER: Sarah Grueneberg
LOSER: Michael Gulotta
CHOSEN TO CHALLENGE: Shota Nakajima
 Secret Ingredient Showdown: Octopus is the secret ingredient.
WINNER: Shota Nakajima
ELIMINATED: Michael Gulotta
 First aired: April 30, 2017

Episode 4: Classic Combos
Chairman's Challenge: The chefs are assigned a classic combination of flavors and must construct a dish around them.
WINNER: Jason Dady
LOSER: Shota Nakajima
CHOSEN TO CHALLENGE: Stephanie Izard
 Secret Ingredient Showdown: Chicken is the secret ingredient.
WINNER: Stephanie Izard
ELIMINATED: Shota Nakajima
 First aired: May 7, 2017

Episode 5: Five Ingredients
 Chairman's Challenge: The chefs are only allowed to use five ingredients to make their dish, but they may use as much of the ingredients as they choose. In addition, the chef who loses this challenge will be automatically eliminated.
WINNER: Stephanie Izard
ELIMINATED: Jason Dady
 Secret Ingredient Showdown: Eggs are the secret ingredient.
WINNER: Stephanie Izard
ELIMINATED: Sarah Grueneberg
 First aired: May 14, 2017

Episode 6: The Gauntlet
 Stephanie Izard must now compete against Iron Chefs Flay, Morimoto, and Symon in three separate Secret Ingredient Showdowns, in an order of her choosing.
 Secret Ingredient Showdown 1: Peppers are the secret ingredient, and Izard chooses to battle Flay.
 Secret Ingredient Showdown 2: Cheese is the secret ingredient, and Izard chooses to battle Symon.
 Secret Ingredient Showdown 3: Tilefish is the secret ingredient, and by process of elimination, Izard battles Morimoto.
 RESULTS: With a final total score of 90-87, Izard defeats the Iron Chefs and earns the title of Iron Chef.
NEW IRON CHEF: Stephanie Izard
 First aired: May 21, 2017

Season 2: 2018

Contestants
 Timon Balloo (Miami, Florida); Executive Chef/Partner, SUGARCANE raw bar grill. Balloo lost to Iron Chef Guarnaschelli in Battle Bar Food on Iron Chef Showdown.
 Nicole Gomes (Calgary, Alberta); Executive Chef/Owner, Nicole Gourmet Catering.
 David LeFevre (Manhattan Beach, California); Executive Chef/Owner, Manhattan Beach Post.
 Dale MacKay (Saskatoon, Saskatchewan); Executive Chef/Owner, Grassroots.
 Jeanie Roland (Punta Gorda, Florida); Executive Chef/Owner, The Perfect Caper and Ella's Fine Food.
 Hong Thaimee (New York, New York); Executive Chef/Owner, Thaimee Box, Thaimee Table and Thaimee Magic. Thaimee lost to Iron Chef Flay in Battle Tamarind on Iron Chef America.
 Kevin Tien (Washington, D.C.); Executive Chef/Owner, Himitsu.

Judges
 Episode 1: Geoffrey Zakarian and Ching-He Huang
 Episode 2: Marc Forgione and Judy Joo
 Episode 3: Jose Garces and Anne Burrell
 Episode 4: Alex Guarnaschelli and Simon Majumdar
 Episode 5: Cat Cora and Rocco DiSpirito
 Episode 6: Donatella Arpaia, Marcus Samuelsson and Alton Brown
 Alton Brown was added as a third judge only for the third battle of the Gauntlet

Contestant progress

 (LOST) This chef lost the Gauntlet and did not become an Iron Chef.
 (WINNER) This chef won the competition.
 (IN) The chef was not selected as a top or bottom entry in the Chairman's Challenge or did not compete in the Secret Ingredient Showdown.
 (LOW) The chef lost the Chairman's Challenge and must compete in the Secret Ingredient Showdown.
 (SEL) The chef was selected to compete in the Secret Ingredient Showdown.
 (WIN) The chef won the Chairman's Challenge or Secret Ingredient Showdown.
 (OUT) The chef lost the Secret Ingredient Showdown and was eliminated.

Results

Episode 1: Resourcefulness
 Chairman's Challenge: The chefs are given 45 minutes to prepare a dish using as many preparations and parts of the various proteins they obtain from the altar.
WINNER: Dale MacKay
LOSER: Jeanie Roland
CHOSEN TO CHALLENGE: Kevin Tien
 Secret Ingredient Showdown: Spanish mackerel is the secret ingredient.
WINNER: Kevin Tien
ELIMINATED: Jeanie Roland
 First aired: April 4, 2018

Episode 2: Innovation
 Chairman's Challenge: The chefs must present an innovative sandwich in 30 minutes.
WINNER: Hong Thaimee
LOSER: Dale MacKay
CHOSEN TO CHALLENGE: David LeFevre
 Secret Ingredient Showdown: Beets are the secret ingredient.
WINNER: David LeFevre
ELIMINATED: Dale MacKay
 First aired: April 11, 2018

Episode 3: Versatility
 Chairman's Challenge: The chefs are given 30 minutes to prepare dishes with ingredients based on their assigned regional cuisine.
WINNER: Nicole Gomes
LOSER: Hong Thaimee
CHOSEN TO CHALLENGE: Kevin Tien
 Secret Ingredient Showdown: Wild boar is the secret ingredient.
WINNER: Hong Thaimee
ELIMINATED: Kevin Tien
 First aired: April 18, 2018

Episode 4: Ingenuity
 Chairman's Challenge: The final four chefs must prepare an inventive breakfast dish in 30 minutes.
WINNER: Nicole Gomes
LOSER: Hong Thaimee
CHOSEN TO CHALLENGE: David LeFevre
 Secret Ingredient Showdown: Scallops are the secret ingredient.
WINNER: David LeFevre
ELIMINATED: Hong Thaimee
 First aired: April 25, 2018

Episode 5: Adaptabiliity
 Chairman's Challenge: Each chef selected two ingredients that are difficult to pair, then assigned them to another chef. The chef who loses this challenge will be automatically eliminated.
WINNER: None
ELIMINATED: Timon Balloo
 Secret Ingredient Showdown: Chops are the secret ingredient.
WINNER: David LeFevre
ELIMINATED: Nicole Gomes
 First aired: May 2, 2018

Episode 6: The Gauntlet Finale
 David LeFevre must now compete against Iron Chefs Izard, Symon, and Guarnaschelli in three separate Secret Ingredient Showdowns. In each round, LeFevre must decide between two ingredients, with significance to his opponent, to use as the secret ingredient they both must use. The chefs will only prepare one dish in each showdown.
 Secret Ingredient Showdown 1: Stephanie Izard
Goat and chocolate are the options, and LeFevre chooses goat.
 Secret Ingredient Showdown 2: Michael Symon
Bacon and sturgeon  are the options, and LeFevre chooses sturgeon.
 Secret Ingredient Showdown 3: Alex Guarnaschelli
Eggplant and sea urchin are the options, and LeFevre chooses sea urchin. In addition, Alton Brown is added as a judge for this third battle.
 RESULTS: With a final total score of 115-113, the Iron Chefs emerge as the victors, and LeFevre fails to become an Iron Chef.
WINNER(S): Stephanie Izard, Michael Symon, & Alex Guarnaschelli
 First aired: May 9, 2018

Companion shows

The Legend of Iron Chef
The series was preceded by the special episode "The Legend of Iron Chef", an overview of Iron Chef, Iron Chef America and The Next Iron Chef on Food Network, with Alton Brown reviewing key aspects and highlights from the shows. It also previewed Iron Chef Gauntlet and Alton Brown's new role in the new show.

Iron Chef Eats
A companion series, Iron Chef Eats, has been produced to go along with Iron Chef Gauntlet. In the show, various restaurants and foods are profiled which are places where Iron Chefs and Iron Chef competitors go to eat.

References

Food Network original programming
2017 American television series debuts
2010s American reality television series
2010s American cooking television series
Iron Chef
Cooking competitions in the United States
2018 American television series endings